Matthew Cooper Wale (born 13 June 1968) is a Solomon Islands politician. He is a member of the National Parliament of the Solomon Islands, and was elected to Parliament representing the Aoke/Langalanga constituency on 27 March 2008.

Political career 
After the 2019 general election, he became the Leader of the Opposition.

On 28 November, he filed a no-confidence motion against the Sogavare government, with debate scheduled for 6 December. The motion creates a potential flashpoint for further unrest.

References

1968 births
Living people
People from Malaita Province
Solomon Islands Democratic Party politicians

Leaders of the Opposition (Solomon Islands)
Members of the National Parliament of the Solomon Islands